Pulang Pisau Regency is one of the thirteen regencies which comprise the Central Kalimantan Province on the island of Kalimantan (Borneo), Indonesia. The town of Pulang Pisau is the capital of Pulang Pisau Regency. The population of Pulang Pisau Regency was 120,062 at the 2010 Census (an increase from 111,488 at the previous Census in 2000); and 134,499 at the 2020 Census; the official estimate as at mid 2021 was 135,639. Pulang Pisau Regency was formed in 2002 by splitting away from Kapuas Regency.

Administrative Districts 
Pulang Pisau Regency consists of eight districts (kecamatan), tabulated below with their areas and their population totals from the 2010 Census and the 2020 Census, together with the official estimates as at mid 2021. The two most northerly districts (Kahayan Tengah and Banama Tingang) are upstream on the Kahayan River, and are physically almost separated from the rest of the regency. The table also includes the locations of the district administrative centres, the number of administrative villages (rural desa and urban kelurahan) in each district, and its postal codes. 

Note: (a) Kahayan Hilir District has a variety of postcodes; Gohong and Kalawa villages have a postcode of 74812, Anjir Pulang Pisau has 74813, Mintin has 74816, Hanjack Maju has 74821, Bereng has 74831, Kahayan Hilir village has 74841 and Buntoi, Mantaren I and Mantaren II share 74861.

Orangutan conservation
In 2015, the local government agreed to make Badak Besar and Badak Kecil regions on Salat Nusa Island to be a conservation area for orangutans. Central Kalimantan province has an orangutan rehabilitation area in Nyaru Menteng.

Climate
Pulang Pisau has a tropical rainforest climate (Af) with heavy rainfall in all months except July and August.

References

External links 

 

Regencies of Central Kalimantan
2002 establishments in Indonesia